Steve Reese (born October 8, 1980 in Salem, Oregon) is a former American soccer player who currently coaches at the Portland Timbers academy.

Career

College and Amateur
Reese grew up in Salem, Oregon, attending South Salem High School where he was an all state soccer player. Reese attended Western Baptist College (now Corban University) for one year, 2000-2001 before leaving school to pursue a professional career.  While at Western Baptist, he played one season, 2000, of college soccer at the NAIA school.

In 1997-1999 Reese also spent three seasons with the Cascade Surge of the USISL when he was a teenager.

Professional
Reese traveled to Europe where he signed with FCM Bacău in the Romanian Liga I. He was loaned to Liga III team Aerostar Bacău.  In early 2003, he moved to FC Timişoara of the Romanian Liga I.  He also spent time training on the Isle of Wight.

In 2004, Reese returned to the U.S. where he spent several weeks training with the MetroStars of Major League Soccer.  While he appeared in a preseason game, he was not offered a contract.  He then trained with the Portland Timbers for the remainder of the season.

In 2006, Reese spent the season with the Cascade Surge of the division USL Premier Development League. He was 1-5-0 with a 2.40 goals against average. On May 23, 2007, the Portland Timbers of the USL First Division signed Reese as the team’s third string goalkeeper. The Timbers kept him through the 2008 season, but he never played a game and was released before the 2009 season. He signed in November 2008 with Monterrey La Raza of the National Indoor Soccer League.  He played five games and was named to the 2008-2009 NISL All Rookie Team.

In 2009, Reese returned to Cascade Surge which folded at the end of the season.  In November 2010, he signed with the Kitsap Pumas of the Professional Arena Soccer League.

Coaching
In 2006, Reese served as the goalkeeper coach for the Oregon State Beavers women’s soccer team.  He is also the goalkeeper coach for Oregon’s Olympic Development Program team.  In 2008, he was an assistant coach with Concordia University, Portland.

References

External links
 Portland Timbers profile
 Oregon Beavers coaches profile

1980 births
Living people
American expatriate soccer players
American soccer coaches
American soccer players
Cascade Surge players
Corban University alumni
Expatriate footballers in Romania
American expatriate sportspeople in Romania
FCM Bacău players
CS Aerostar Bacău players
FC Politehnica Timișoara players
Association football goalkeepers
Liga I players
Monterrey La Raza players
Major Indoor Soccer League (2008–2014) players
Sportspeople from Salem, Oregon
Portland Timbers (2001–2010) players
Soccer players from Oregon
USISL players
Concordia University (Oregon)
USL League Two players
South Salem High School alumni
Portland Timbers non-playing staff
Oregon State Beavers coaches
Kitsap Pumas players
Professional Arena Soccer League players